Gaioi Tufele Galeai served as the interim lieutenant governor of American Samoa from 1992 until 1993. She was appointed by Governor Peter Tali Coleman to fill the remainder of the term of her husband, Galea'i Peni Poumele, who had died in office. She was a member of the Republican Party of American Samoa.

Gaioi is the daughter of High Chief Tufele. She married Galea'i Peni Poumele on July 20, 1946, in Faga'alu, American Samoa. They had a total of seven biological children, three adopted children, 26 grandchildren, and three great-grandchildren.

References

Living people
Date of birth missing (living people)
Lieutenant Governors of American Samoa
American Samoa Republicans
American Samoan women in politics
20th-century American politicians
20th-century American women politicians
Year of birth missing (living people)
21st-century American women